Nathaniel Terry (born July 20, 1956) is a former American football defensive back and return specialist who played a single season in the National Football League (NFL) for the Pittsburgh Steelers and Detroit Lions.

Early life
Terry was born in Tampa, Florida and attended Robinson High School Then Florida State University in Tallahassee, Florida where he played twice lettered in football. He was an honorable mention All-America selection in his senior season.

Football career
Terry was selected in the eleventh round of the 1978 NFL Draft by the Pittsburgh Steelers. Although he was considered undersized to play cornerback in the NFL he made up for it with his speed (he was timed at 4.4 seconds in the 40-yard dash). After making the Steelers' roster and playing the first six games of the season (primarily on special teams), he was cut to make room for another player.

The Detroit Lions claimed Terry off waivers the next day. On the opening kickoff of his fourth game with the Lions he suffered a chipped vertebrae in his neck and was placed on the injured reserve list, ending his season and eventually his playing career.

References

1956 births
Living people
American football defensive backs
Pittsburgh Steelers players
Detroit Lions players
Florida State Seminoles football players
Players of American football from Tampa, Florida